Tears from Heaven is a musical with a book by Phoebe Hwang, lyrics by Robin Lerner, and music by Frank Wildhorn. It is set during the Vietnam War.

Plot
Vietnam, 1968: A love triangle between a beautiful Vietnamese singer, a Korean private, and an American Colonel set against the backdrop of the days leading up to and during the Tet Offensive. The tale follows our leads to Seoul, Korea, and San Francisco's Chinatown.

Songs

 Between Heaven and Earth
 Shadows On My Heart
 Pearl of The East
 The First Time I Saw Paris
 The Tiger and The Dove
 Who Can You Trust
 Morning Comes
 I've Never Loved Like This
 Can You Hear Me?

 I've Had To Learn
 The End of The World
 Tears From Heaven
 Moving On
 Raining Fire
 Without Her
 Sweet Song of Life
 This Is My Confession
 Tiger and The Dove Finale

Production
The musical had a reading in September 2009 in New York, featuring Deborah Lew, Paolo Montalban and John Cudia, and direction by Gabriel Barre.

An English language concept recording was released on Global Vision Records, featuring Linda Eder, Rob Evan and Christiane Noll.

The musical premiered in South Korea in 2011 at the National Theater in Seoul. Directed by Gabriel Barre, the cast featured Junsu and Brad Little.

References

2011 musicals
Fiction about interracial romance
Plays set in the 1960s
Plays set in Vietnam
Musicals by Frank Wildhorn
Vietnam War fiction
Fiction set in 1968